James Gay Gordon (1855-1937) was a judge in Pennsylvania.

References 

American judges
1855 births
1937 deaths